RaidForums was an English-language black hat hacking internet forum active from 2015 until 2022. The website facilitated the discussion of a variety of hacking topics and was a notable distributor of various data breaches, hacking tools, and pornography until its seizure in 2022. The website was monetized via advertisements and through a tiered membership program where members with higher tiers would receive elevated access to the forum and its contents.

History 
RaidForums began in 2015 as a platform for Twitch raiders.

Domain seizure 
The domain and its contents were seized by the Federal Bureau of Investigation on April 12, 2022 after a month of downtime, in collaboration with the United States Secret Service, the United States Department of Justice, and a variety of other national and international law enforcement agencies.

Administration 
The website was allegedly founded by a 21-year old Portuguese national, Diogo Santos Coelho under the screen name "Omnipotent", who was arrested on January 31, 2022 in the United Kingdom. His arrest occurred pending several years of investigation after several of his devices were searched under warrant at the Hartsfield-Jackson International Airport in June 2018, suggesting he was the owner and primary administrator "Omnipotent". According to hackread.com, a separate administrator under screen name "Jaw" announced the seizure officially on the forum's public Telegram channel, and redirected subscribers of the channel to RaidForums' backup domain rf.to, which however went offline (and has remained offline for months) after this statement, only becoming reachable again after Diogo Santos Coelho's release on bail in August 2022.

Impact 
At the time of its closure in 2022, the forum had over 530,000 registered users and was one of the most prolific and easily accessible clearnet illicit hacking forums.

See also 
 BlackHatWorld
 Dark0de
 Hack Forums
 Nulled

References

External links
 
 U.S. Department of Justice indictment

Crime forums
Works about computer hacking
Internet properties disestablished in 2022
Internet properties established in 2015
Domain name seizures by United States